Perry Point is an unincorporated community in Cecil County, Maryland, United States. Perry Point is located on the east bank of the Susquehanna River south of Perryville and north of the river's mouth into the Chesapeake Bay.

References

Unincorporated communities in Cecil County, Maryland
Unincorporated communities in Maryland
Maryland populated places on the Chesapeake Bay